"Tell Me Where It Hurts" is a song written by Diane Warren originally recorded by the Real Milli Vanilli for their 1991 album The Moment of Truth. The song has been covered by many artists in the subsequent years.

Try 'N' B version

The song was first covered by German group Try 'N' B. The group was formed by two members of the Real Milli Vanilli with two new members, and their album was essentially an updated version of that group's album. The group were the first to release the song as a single in 1992, as the second single of their album (titled "Sexy Eyes" in Europe and self-titled in America), but it failed to chart.

Kathy Troccoli version

Christian music artist Kathy Troccoli covered the song for her 1994 album Kathy Troccoli and released it as the lead single. It became her second song to enter the Billboard Hot 100, peaking at No. 88. The song fared better on the Adult Contemporary charts, where it peaked at No. 16.

Chart performance

Tommy Shane Steiner version

Country singer Tommy Shane Steiner covered the song on his debut album Then Came the Night. The cover was the second single from the album and reached No. 43 on the Billboard Hot Country Singles & Tracks chart.

Chart performance

Notable cover versions
Filipino acoustic band MYMP released a cover in their 2005 album Beyond Acoustic. It became an acoustic hit in the Philippines.

References

1990 singles
2000 singles
2005 singles
Songs written by Diane Warren
1990 songs
RCA Records singles